César Valverde Vega (8 March 1928 – 3 December 1998) was a Costa Rican painter.

Biography 
César Valverde Vega was born on 8 March 1928. His parents were César Valverde Monestel and Hilma Vega Jiménez. After his return to Costa Rica, Valverde Vega attended primary school at Escuela Buenaventura Corrales. He received his bachelor's degree from Collegio Seminario in 1945. At the University of Costa Rica, he chose to study law. He ended up studying fine arts in addition to his work in law and eventually finishing with this degree as well. He went on to study law in Spain and art in France and Italy.

References
This article was initially translated from the Spanish Wikipedia.

Costa Rican painters
1928 births
1998 deaths
20th-century Costa Rican painters